Hagerman Tunnel was a 2,161 ft (659 m) railroad tunnel crossing the Continental Divide in Colorado at an altitude of 11,528 ft (3,514 m). 

Constructed in 1887 by the Colorado Midland Railroad and named for Midland officer James John Hagerman, it was replaced by the Busk-Ivanhoe Tunnel in 1893. There was a 1,084 ft (330 m) wooden trestle built on the eastern approach to the tunnel. At the time of its construction it was one of the highest tunnels ever built.

Following Colorado Midland's 1897 bankruptcy, the tunnel saw use again, but traffic returned to the Busk-Ivanhoe tunnel a few years later.

References

External links
Photos from a 2006 trip to the east portal of the Hagerman tunnel

Transportation buildings and structures in Lake County, Colorado
Transportation buildings and structures in Pitkin County, Colorado
Railroad tunnels in Colorado
Tunnels completed in 1883
1883 establishments in Colorado